Busan–Ulsan Expressway may refer to:

 Busan–Ulsan Expressway, a section of the Donghae Expressway in South Korea
 Busan–Ulsan Expressway Co., Ltd., the company that built and operates that section